Ricardo "Ricky" Tosso Febres (February 21, 1960 – September 11, 2016) was a Peruvian actor born in Arequipa.

He started acting when he was 4 years old and appeared on many Peruvian TV shows during his career. He is the son of Ricardo Tosso, a well-known Peruvian actor and Angélica Febres. 

His TV program Teatro desde el Teatro has become a classic of Peruvian television. In 2010 he appeared in the play El Enfermo Imaginario. On 11 September 2016, he died at the age of 56 from cancer.

Career
 1964-1967 - Mipayachi (PANTEL)
 1977 - Mi Barrio (PANTEL)
 1981 - El Show de Rulito y Sonia (America TV)
 1983 - Tulio de America a Cholocolor (America TV)
 1984-1985 - Los Detectilocos (America TV)
 1988 - El Agente Fantastico (PANTEL)
 1988 - Supercatonicomicos (PANTEL)
 1989 - El Club de Ricky (PANTEL)
 1989 - La Maquina de la Risa (America TV)
 1990 - El Super Club de Ricky (RBC)
 1993-1997 - Risas y Salsa (PANTEL)
 1997 - Leonela (America TV)
 1998-1999 - Risas de America (America TV)
 1999 - Isabela (America TV)
 2000 - Bia, Bia, Bia (Frecuencia Latina)
 2001 - Vale la Pena Soñar (Frecuencia Latina)
 2002–2008 - Teatro desde el Teatro (America TV)
 2004 - Muero por Muriel (Iguana Productions)
 2008 - El circo de Ricky y sus estrellas de la tele (Circo)

References

1960 births
2016 deaths
People from Arequipa
20th-century Peruvian male actors
21st-century Peruvian male actors
Peruvian male television actors
Male actors from Lima
Peruvian male child actors
Deaths from cancer
Place of death missing